The Braille pattern dots-126 is a 6-dot braille cell with the top and middle left, and bottom right dots raised, or an 8-dot braille cell with the top and upper-middle left, and lower-middle right dots raised. It is represented by the Unicode code point U+2823, and in Braille ASCII with the less than sign: <.

Unified Braille

In unified international braille, the braille pattern dots-126 is used to represent a voiced dorsal fricative or aspirate, such as /ɣ/, /ʁ/, or /gʱ/, or otherwise as needed.

Table of unified Braille values

Other Braille

Plus dots 7 and 8

Related to Braille pattern dots-126 are Braille patterns 1267, 1268, and 12678, which are used in 8-dot braille systems, such as Gardner-Salinas and Luxembourgish Braille.

Related 8-dot kantenji patterns

In the Japanese kantenji braille, the standard 8-dot Braille patterns 238, 1238, 2348, and 12348 are the patterns related to Braille pattern dots-126, since the two additional dots of kantenji patterns 0126, 1267, and 01267 are placed above the base 6-dot cell, instead of below, as in standard 8-dot braille.

Kantenji using braille patterns 238, 1238, 2348, or 12348

This listing includes kantenji using Braille pattern dots-126 for all 6349 kanji found in JIS C 6226-1978.

  - 木

Variants and thematic compounds

  -  selector 1 + き/木  =  甚
  -  selector 2 + き/木  =  巳
  -  selector 3 + き/木  =  已
  -  selector 4 + き/木  =  其
  -  き/木 + selector 4  =  未
  -  き/木 + selector 5  =  末
  -  き/木 + selector 6  =  本
  -  比 + き/木  =  北
  -  数 + き/木  =  己

Compounds of 木

  -  な/亻 + き/木  =  休
  -  る/忄 + な/亻 + き/木  =  恷
  -  火 + な/亻 + き/木  =  烋
  -  そ/馬 + な/亻 + き/木  =  貅
  -  せ/食 + な/亻 + き/木  =  鮴
  -  囗 + き/木  =  困
  -  る/忄 + 囗 + き/木  =  悃
  -  き/木 + 囗 + き/木  =  梱
  -  宿 + き/木  =  宋
  -  か/金 + き/木  =  巣
  -  ね/示 + か/金 + き/木  =  剿
  -  ぬ/力 + か/金 + き/木  =  勦
  -  き/木 + か/金 + き/木  =  樔
  -  よ/广 + き/木  =  床
  -  て/扌 + き/木  =  控
  -  ろ/十 + き/木  =  材
  -  す/発 + き/木  =  条
  -  す/発 + す/発 + き/木  =  條
  -  に/氵 + す/発 + き/木  =  滌
  -  心 + す/発 + き/木  =  篠
  -  き/木 + き/木  =  林
  -  火 + き/木  =  焚
  -  つ/土 + き/木 + き/木  =  埜
  -  ふ/女 + き/木 + き/木  =  婪
  -  て/扌 + き/木 + き/木  =  攀
  -  ほ/方 + き/木 + き/木  =  梦
  -  心 + き/木 + き/木  =  楚
  -  ま/石 + き/木  =  礎
  -  け/犬 + き/木 + き/木  =  樊
  -  に/氵 + き/木 + き/木  =  淋
  -  へ/⺩ + き/木 + き/木  =  琳
  -  や/疒 + き/木 + き/木  =  痳
  -  ま/石 + き/木 + き/木  =  礬
  -  す/発 + き/木 + き/木  =  罧
  -  せ/食 + き/木 + き/木  =  醂
  -  ち/竹 + き/木 + き/木  =  霖
  -  た/⽥ + き/木  =  果
  -  く/艹 + き/木  =  菓
  -  ね/示 + き/木  =  裸
  -  ね/示 + た/⽥ + き/木  =  裹
  -  み/耳 + た/⽥ + き/木  =  踝
  -  お/頁 + た/⽥ + き/木  =  顆
  -  れ/口 + き/木  =  架
  -  る/忄 + き/木  =  某
  -  心 + る/忄 + き/木  =  楳
  -  氷/氵 + き/木  =  染
  -  龸 + き/木  =  栄
  -  龸 + 龸 + き/木  =  榮
  -  む/車 + 龸 + き/木  =  蠑
  -  み/耳 + き/木  =  栽
  -  ゆ/彳 + き/木  =  桁
  -  ふ/女 + き/木  =  案
  -  め/目 + き/木  =  植
  -  に/氵 + き/木  =  漆
  -  心 + き/木  =  茶
  -  も/門 + き/木  =  閑
  -  ふ/女 + も/門 + き/木  =  嫻
  -  き/木 + を/貝  =  札
  -  い/糹/#2 + き/木 + を/貝  =  紮
  -  き/木 + 龸  =  机
  -  き/木 + も/門  =  朽
  -  き/木 + し/巿  =  村
  -  き/木 + 火  =  杖
  -  き/木 + 数  =  束
  -  selector 1 + き/木 + 数  =  朿
  -  き/木 + き/木 + 数  =  棗
  -  心 + き/木 + 数  =  棘
  -  き/木 + ぬ/力  =  刺
  -  selector 1 + き/木 + ぬ/力  =  剌
  -  れ/口 + き/木 + ぬ/力  =  喇
  -  に/氵 + き/木 + ぬ/力  =  溂
  -  る/忄 + き/木 + 数  =  悚
  -  ま/石 + き/木 + 数  =  竦
  -  み/耳 + き/木 + 数  =  踈
  -  き/木 + 宿  =  杭
  -  き/木 + ふ/女  =  杯
  -  き/木 + ん/止  =  板
  -  き/木 + お/頁  =  析
  -  に/氵 + き/木 + お/頁  =  淅
  -  日 + き/木 + お/頁  =  皙
  -  む/車 + き/木 + お/頁  =  蜥
  -  き/木 + み/耳  =  枕
  -  き/木 + 氷/氵  =  枚
  -  き/木 + は/辶  =  枝
  -  き/木 + す/発  =  枢
  -  き/木 + き/木 + す/発  =  樞
  -  き/木 + す/発 + selector 4  =  柩
  -  き/木 + ろ/十  =  枯
  -  き/木 + え/訁  =  柄
  -  き/木 + よ/广  =  柔
  -  て/扌 + き/木 + よ/广  =  揉
  -  の/禾 + き/木 + よ/广  =  糅
  -  み/耳 + き/木 + よ/广  =  蹂
  -  と/戸 + き/木 + よ/广  =  鞣
  -  き/木 + へ/⺩  =  柱
  -  き/木 + へ/⺩ + selector 1  =  枉
  -  き/木 + へ/⺩ + し/巿  =  梼
  -  き/木 + 比  =  柴
  -  き/木 + 日  =  査
  -  に/氵 + き/木 + 日  =  渣
  -  き/木 + ち/竹  =  校
  -  き/木 + か/金  =  株
  -  き/木 + ゐ/幺  =  核
  -  き/木 + や/疒  =  根
  -  き/木 + れ/口  =  格
  -  き/木 + と/戸  =  械
  -  き/木 + ほ/方  =  棒
  -  き/木 + ⺼  =  棚
  -  き/木 + う/宀/#3  =  森
  -  き/木 + さ/阝  =  棲
  -  き/木 + ら/月  =  棺
  -  き/木 + り/分  =  検
  -  き/木 + き/木 + り/分  =  檢
  -  き/木 + ま/石  =  極
  -  き/木 + た/⽥  =  楼
  -  き/木 + き/木 + た/⽥  =  樓
  -  き/木 + 仁/亻  =  概
  -  き/木 + む/車  =  構
  -  き/木 + ひ/辶  =  槌
  -  き/木 + そ/馬  =  様
  -  き/木 + き/木 + そ/馬  =  樣
  -  き/木 + に/氵  =  標
  -  き/木 + く/艹  =  模
  -  き/木 + け/犬  =  権
  -  き/木 + き/木 + け/犬  =  權
  -  き/木 + こ/子  =  横
  -  き/木 + ゆ/彳  =  樹
  -  き/木 + の/禾  =  橋
  -  き/木 + 囗  =  機
  -  き/木 + め/目  =  相
  -  ち/竹 + き/木  =  霜
  -  ふ/女 + ち/竹 + き/木  =  孀
  -  き/木 + 心  =  想
  -  よ/广 + き/木 + め/目  =  廂
  -  に/氵 + き/木 + め/目  =  湘
  -  き/木 + ね/示  =  禁
  -  れ/口 + き/木 + ね/示  =  噤
  -  ね/示 + き/木 + ね/示  =  襟
  -  き/木 + い/糹/#2  =  集
  -  ね/示 + き/木 + い/糹/#2  =  襍
  -  心 + き/木 + う/宀/#3  =  杜
  -  き/木 + む/車 + 宿  =  凩
  -  れ/口 + 宿 + き/木  =  呆
  -  う/宀/#3 + 宿 + き/木  =  寨
  -  き/木 + 心 + う/宀/#3  =  彬
  -  き/木 + 宿 + と/戸  =  朴
  -  き/木 + selector 1 + ゐ/幺  =  朶
  -  き/木 + selector 4 + ぬ/力  =  朷
  -  き/木 + う/宀/#3 + ぬ/力  =  朸
  -  き/木 + 比 + な/亻  =  杁
  -  き/木 + 宿 + か/金  =  杆
  -  き/木 + 比 + も/門  =  杓
  -  き/木 + 龸 + 囗  =  杙
  -  き/木 + 宿 + こ/子  =  杠
  -  き/木 + こ/子 + selector 1  =  杢
  -  き/木 + や/疒 + selector 1  =  杣
  -  き/木 + ほ/方 + そ/馬  =  杪
  -  き/木 + 火 + selector 1  =  杰
  -  日 + 宿 + き/木  =  杲
  -  き/木 + 龸 + 日  =  杳
  -  き/木 + そ/馬 + selector 4  =  杵
  -  き/木 + selector 4 + よ/广  =  杼
  -  き/木 + selector 3 + ね/示  =  枅
  -  き/木 + 宿 + ろ/十  =  枠
  -  き/木 + 比 + く/艹  =  枡
  -  き/木 + 龸 + と/戸  =  枦
  -  き/木 + 龸 + ぬ/力  =  枴
  -  き/木 + ぬ/力 + れ/口  =  枷
  -  き/木 + も/門 + selector 2  =  枹
  -  き/木 + 宿 + ひ/辶  =  柁
  -  き/木 + 龸 + ま/石  =  柆
  -  き/木 + な/亻 + し/巿  =  柎
  -  き/木 + 龸 + を/貝  =  柝
  -  き/木 + よ/广 + ん/止  =  柢
  -  き/木 + selector 5 + そ/馬  =  柤
  -  き/木 + 心 + つ/土  =  柧
  -  き/木 + 比 + へ/⺩  =  柮
  -  き/木 + 比 + か/金  =  柯
  -  き/木 + 宿 + へ/⺩  =  柵
  -  き/木 + り/分 + へ/⺩  =  栓
  -  き/木 + 比 + に/氵  =  栖
  -  き/木 + selector 4 + か/金  =  栞
  -  き/木 + ろ/十 + こ/子  =  栫
  -  き/木 + と/戸 + selector 5  =  栲
  -  き/木 + 宿 + け/犬  =  桀
  -  き/木 + 宿 + も/門  =  框
  -  き/木 + 龸 + け/犬  =  桍
  -  き/木 + selector 4 + ゆ/彳  =  桎
  -  き/木 + selector 5 + 日  =  桓
  -  き/木 + つ/土 + れ/口  =  桔
  -  き/木 + selector 5 + む/車  =  桙
  -  き/木 + selector 5 + い/糹/#2  =  桝
  -  き/木 + 宿 + 囗  =  桟
  -  き/木 + 龸 + ふ/女  =  档
  -  き/木 + selector 2 + う/宀/#3  =  桴
  -  き/木 + 宿 + つ/土  =  桶
  -  き/木 + 囗 + selector 6  =  桷
  -  き/木 + う/宀/#3 + か/金  =  桿
  -  き/木 + 宿 + に/氵  =  梁
  -  き/木 + は/辶 + へ/⺩  =  梃
  -  き/木 + 龸 + や/疒  =  梍
  -  き/木 + こ/子 + く/艹  =  梏
  -  き/木 + 宿 + せ/食  =  梟
  -  き/木 + selector 6 + み/耳  =  梠
  -  き/木 + そ/馬 + ⺼  =  梢
  -  き/木 + 宿 + む/車  =  梭
  -  き/木 + ゆ/彳 + 宿  =  梯
  -  き/木 + 宿 + く/艹  =  梳
  -  き/木 + selector 4 + 龸  =  梵
  -  き/木 + と/戸 + せ/食  =  梶
  -  き/木 + く/艹 + り/分  =  梹
  -  き/木 + 比 + 龸  =  梺
  -  き/木 + 宿 + る/忄  =  棆
  -  き/木 + 龸 + き/木  =  棊
  -  き/木 + 宿 + き/木  =  棋
  -  き/木 + 日 + 比  =  棍
  -  き/木 + 日 + ん/止  =  棔
  -  き/木 + 比 + ひ/辶  =  棟
  -  き/木 + 囗 + ゆ/彳  =  棡
  -  き/木 + selector 4 + 囗  =  棧
  -  き/木 + り/分 + 心  =  棯
  -  き/木 + 日 + と/戸  =  棹
  -  き/木 + 宿 + う/宀/#3  =  椀
  -  き/木 + 龸 + こ/子  =  椁
  -  き/木 + ふ/女 + ま/石  =  椄
  -  き/木 + り/分 + 日  =  椙
  -  き/木 + く/艹 + 比  =  椛
  -  き/木 + ゆ/彳 + ぬ/力  =  椡
  -  き/木 + 囗 + へ/⺩  =  椢
  -  き/木 + た/⽥ + り/分  =  椣
  -  き/木 + や/疒 + れ/口  =  椥
  -  き/木 + け/犬 + ぬ/力  =  椦
  -  き/木 + よ/广 + し/巿  =  椨
  -  き/木 + ま/石 + ま/石  =  椪
  -  き/木 + selector 4 + の/禾  =  椴
  -  き/木 + 龸 + そ/馬  =  椽
  -  き/木 + ぬ/力 + け/犬  =  楔
  -  き/木 + 宿 + ら/月  =  楕
  -  き/木 + 数 + る/忄  =  楞
  -  き/木 + 宿 + よ/广  =  楪
  -  き/木 + れ/口 + み/耳  =  楫
  -  き/木 + よ/广 + め/目  =  楯
  -  き/木 + 比 + 日  =  楷
  -  き/木 + 宿 + ⺼  =  楹
  -  き/木 + 日 + 氷/氵  =  楾
  -  き/木 + う/宀/#3 + た/⽥  =  榕
  -  き/木 + 宿 + ほ/方  =  榜
  -  き/木 + 宿 + ね/示  =  榱
  -  き/木 + む/車 + selector 2  =  榻
  -  き/木 + 比 + え/訁  =  槁
  -  き/木 + ふ/女 + の/禾  =  槃
  -  き/木 + ら/月 + は/辶  =  槊
  -  き/木 + り/分 + お/頁  =  槍
  -  き/木 + そ/馬 + こ/子  =  槎
  -  き/木 + を/貝 + こ/子  =  槓
  -  き/木 + せ/食 + や/疒  =  槝
  -  き/木 + ま/石 + 心  =  槞
  -  き/木 + む/車 + を/貝  =  槧
  -  き/木 + さ/阝 + こ/子  =  槨
  -  き/木 + selector 4 + て/扌  =  槫
  -  き/木 + 日 + selector 1  =  槹
  -  き/木 + selector 1 + そ/馬  =  槽
  -  心 + 宿 + き/木  =  槿
  -  き/木 + は/辶 + つ/土  =  樋
  -  き/木 + 比 + つ/土  =  樌
  -  き/木 + 龸 + む/車  =  樛
  -  き/木 + せ/食 + selector 1  =  樢
  -  き/木 + 宿 + 火  =  樮
  -  き/木 + い/糹/#2 + 火  =  樵
  -  き/木 + 日 + ゑ/訁  =  樶
  -  き/木 + 宿 + な/亻  =  樸
  -  き/木 + 宿 + た/⽥  =  樽
  -  き/木 + 龸 + 龸  =  橇
  -  き/木 + 宿 + 龸  =  橈
  -  き/木 + さ/阝 + ら/月  =  橢
  -  き/木 + ま/石 + り/分  =  橦
  -  き/木 + つ/土 + 囗  =  橲
  -  き/木 + 日 + 龸  =  橸
  -  き/木 + 宿 + 氷/氵  =  檄
  -  き/木 + う/宀/#3 + 日  =  檐
  -  き/木 + も/門 + 氷/氵  =  檠
  -  き/木 + 囗 + れ/口  =  檣
  -  き/木 + 龸 + へ/⺩  =  檮
  -  き/木 + す/発 + ⺼  =  檻
  -  き/木 + 宿 + や/疒  =  櫂
  -  き/木 + た/⽥ + た/⽥  =  櫑
  -  き/木 + 宿 + 日  =  櫓
  -  き/木 + ち/竹 + さ/阝  =  櫛
  -  き/木 + こ/子 + ん/止  =  櫪
  -  き/木 + ち/竹 + selector 1  =  櫺
  -  え/訁 + 宿 + き/木  =  欒
  -  に/氵 + 宿 + き/木  =  沐
  -  よ/广 + よ/广 + き/木  =  牀
  -  ま/石 + 宿 + き/木  =  磔
  -  ち/竹 + 宿 + き/木  =  簗
  -  心 + う/宀/#3 + き/木  =  菻
  -  く/艹 + 宿 + き/木  =  藁
  -  き/木 + ま/石 + selector 1  =  蘖
  -  き/木 + そ/馬 + 比  =  麓

Compounds of 甚

  -  つ/土 + き/木  =  堪
  -  心 + selector 1 + き/木  =  椹
  -  に/氵 + selector 1 + き/木  =  湛
  -  ま/石 + selector 1 + き/木  =  碪
  -  の/禾 + selector 1 + き/木  =  糂
  -  か/金 + selector 1 + き/木  =  鍖

Compounds of 巳, 已, and 己

  -  火 + selector 2 + き/木  =  煕
  -  ね/示 + 宿 + き/木  =  祀
  -  い/糹/#2 + き/木  =  紀
  -  え/訁 + き/木  =  記
  -  は/辶 + き/木  =  起
  -  せ/食 + き/木  =  配
  -  き/木 + る/忄  =  忌
  -  へ/⺩ + き/木  =  妃
  -  心 + 数 + き/木  =  杞

Compounds of 其

  -  ほ/方 + き/木  =  旗
  -  ち/竹 + ほ/方 + き/木  =  籏
  -  ん/止 + き/木  =  欺
  -  ら/月 + き/木  =  期
  -  き/木 + つ/土  =  基
  -  に/氵 + selector 4 + き/木  =  淇
  -  ね/示 + selector 4 + き/木  =  祺
  -  の/禾 + selector 4 + き/木  =  稘
  -  ち/竹 + selector 4 + き/木  =  箕
  -  そ/馬 + selector 4 + き/木  =  騏
  -  き/木 + 宿 + を/貝  =  斯
  -  よ/广 + 宿 + き/木  =  厮
  -  よ/广 + 龸 + き/木  =  廝
  -  ら/月 + 宿 + き/木  =  朞
  -  き/木 + 宿 + ま/石  =  碁
  -  き/木 + 宿 + そ/馬  =  麒

Compounds of 未, 末, and 本

  -  き/木 + な/亻  =  来
  -  き/木 + き/木 + な/亻  =  來
  -  ゆ/彳 + き/木 + な/亻  =  徠
  -  る/忄 + き/木 + な/亻  =  憖
  -  を/貝 + き/木 + な/亻  =  賚
  -  の/禾 + き/木  =  乗
  -  の/禾 + の/禾 + き/木  =  乘
  -  selector 1 + の/禾 + き/木  =  乖
  -  そ/馬 + き/木  =  業
  -  お/頁 + き/木  =  魅
  -  う/宀/#3 + き/木 + selector 4  =  寐
  -  日 + き/木 + selector 4  =  昧
  -  め/目 + き/木 + selector 4  =  眛
  -  き/木 + せ/食  =  耗
  -  え/訁 + き/木 + な/亻  =  誄
  -  き/木 + よ/广 + り/分  =  釐
  -  て/扌 + き/木 + selector 5  =  抹
  -  に/氵 + き/木 + selector 5  =  沫
  -  の/禾 + き/木 + selector 5  =  秣
  -  心 + き/木 + selector 5  =  茉
  -  心 + き/木 + な/亻  =  莱
  -  と/戸 + き/木 + selector 5  =  靺
  -  ち/竹 + き/木 + selector 6  =  笨
  -  み/耳 + き/木 + selector 6  =  躰
  -  日 + き/木 + selector 6  =  皋

Compounds of 北

  -  ⺼ + き/木  =  背
  -  き/木 + た/⽥ + こ/子  =  冀
  -  そ/馬 + 宿 + き/木  =  驥

Other compounds

  -  仁/亻 + き/木  =  僅
  -  ぬ/力 + き/木  =  勤
  -  ゑ/訁 + き/木  =  謹
  -  う/宀/#3 + き/木  =  空
  -  な/亻 + う/宀/#3 + き/木  =  倥
  -  れ/口 + う/宀/#3 + き/木  =  啌
  -  き/木 + う/宀/#3 + き/木  =  椌
  -  ち/竹 + う/宀/#3 + き/木  =  箜
  -  ⺼ + う/宀/#3 + き/木  =  腔
  -  を/貝 + き/木  =  貴
  -  ひ/辶 + き/木  =  遺
  -  も/門 + を/貝 + き/木  =  匱
  -  き/木 + を/貝 + き/木  =  櫃
  -  め/目 + を/貝 + き/木  =  瞶
  -  ち/竹 + を/貝 + き/木  =  簣
  -  せ/食 + を/貝 + き/木  =  饋
  -  き/木 + ゑ/訁  =  叢
  -  り/分 + 宿 + き/木  =  禽
  -  て/扌 + 宿 + き/木  =  擒
  -  火 + 宿 + き/木  =  熈
  -  へ/⺩ + 宿 + き/木  =  瑾
  -  き/木 + め/目 + 宿  =  覲
  -  せ/食 + 宿 + き/木  =  饉
  -  心 + 龸 + き/木  =  菫
  -  き/木 + 心 + 心  =  蕊

Notes

Braille patterns